PRC (Product Representation Compact) is a file format that can be used to embed 3D data in a PDF file.

This highly compressed format facilitates the storage of different representations of a 3D model. For example, you can save only a visual representation that consists of polygons (a tessellation), or you can save the model's exact geometry (B-rep data). Varying levels of compression can be applied to the 3D CAD data when it is converted to the PRC format using Adobe Acrobat 3D.

The 3D data stored in PRC format in a PDF is interoperable with Computer-Aided Manufacturing (CAM) and Computer-Aided Engineering (CAE) applications.

History
June 12, 2002 TTF Showcases PRC
April 21, 2006 Adobe Acquires Trade and Technologies France (TTF)
December 15, 2014 PRC now published as ISO 14739-1:2014

Software to create PRC 
 Adobe Acrobat "Pro Extended" 8 and 9.
 Adobe Acrobat X and XI with 3D PDF Converter from Tetra 4D.
 CrossCad/Ware from Datakit: SDK for developers to add PRC writing functionalities to their software.
 CrossManager from Datakit: Software to convert 3D formats to PRC.
 Feature Manipulation Engine.
 Geomagic Design.
 HOOPS Exchange libraries from Tech Soft 3D.
 PDF3D, version 2.0 and later.
 PROSTEP PDF Generator 3D.
 SOLIDWORKS allows saving of files to 3D PDF containing PRC since release 2015.
 4D Publish, a plugin for Cinema 4D.

Viewer 
 Adobe Reader 8 and later

See also
Portable Document Format
Universal 3D
Asymptote: Open Source PRC Writer
glTF - a Khronos Group file format for 3D Scenes and models.

References

External links
Acrobat 3D PRC Specification (Version 8137 (latest))
Acrobat 3D PRC Specification (Version 7094)
Acrobat 3D 8 documentation correction with PRC and U3D conversion formats
ISO/TC171/SC2 N 570 E 3D use of product representation compact (PRC) format.
PRC (Product Representation Compact) Format FAQ
HOOPS Exchange libraries from Tech Soft 3D
PDF3D SDK PRC generation library toolkit from Visual Technology Services Ltd.
3D PDF Converter from tetra4D supports the import and export of PRC files from multiple formats.
PROSTEP PDF Generator 3D - A server-based solution used to automate the generation of 3D PDF documents with embedded PRC streams.
ISO 14739-1:2014 Document management—3D use of Product Representation Compact (PRC) format—Part 1: PRC 10001
The media9 LaTeX package enables the production of PDF documents with embedded PRC files using LaTeX.
4D Publish - A plugin for Cinema 4D that exports the scene as a PRC file and embeds it into a 3D PDF document.
Teigha PRC library from ODA supports content creation and data access for PRC format and enables exporting a .dwg or .dgn file to PRC.

3D graphics file formats
CAD file formats
Filename extensions